The chocolate boobook (Ninox randi) is a bird species in the true owl family, Strigidae. It was formerly considered to be a subspecies of the brown boobook. It is endemic to the Philippines, where it is found on all major islands except Palawan.

References

External links
 https://web.archive.org/web/20090416051719/http://www.ornitaxa.com/SM/Split/SplitTypicalOwls.htm
 http://orientalbirdimages.org/birdimages.php?action=birdspecies&Bird_ID=2759

chocolate boobook
Endemic birds of the Philippines
chocolate boobook
chocolate boobook